The Ebullient Mr. Gillespie is an album by trumpeter Dizzy Gillespie, recorded in 1959 and released on the Verve label.

Reception
The AllMusic review calls the album "a pleasing -- if not all that essential -- date of melodic music from the masterful trumpeter."

Track listing
All compositions by Dizzy Gillespie except as indicated
 "Swing Low, Sweet Cadillac" - 7:06  
 "Always" (Irving Berlin) - 5:34
 "Willow Weep for Me" (Ann Ronell) - 7:20
 "Ungawa" (Gillespie, Oswaldo Nuñez) - 3:19   
 "Lorraine" - 4:14  
 "Girl of My Dreams" (Sunny Clapp) - 7:41  
 "Constantinople" - 7:00  
 "Umbrella Man" (Vincent Rose, Larry Stock, James Cavanaugh) - 2:40

The Fresh Sound 2-CD set also includes the complete Have Trumpet Will Excite Album

Personnel
Dizzy Gillespie - trumpet, (vocals track 1 and 8)
Junior Mance - piano
Les Spann - guitar, flute
Sam Jones - bass
Lex Humphries - drums
Carlos "Patato" Valdes - congas (tracks 4 and 5)

References 

Dizzy Gillespie albums
1959 albums
Verve Records albums
Albums produced by Norman Granz
Albums recorded at CBS 30th Street Studio